Gaol Break is a 1936 British crime film directed by Ralph Ince and starring Ince, Basil Gill and Raymond Lovell.

It was made as a quota quickie at Teddington Studios by the British subsidiary of Warner Brothers.

Cast
 Ralph Ince as Jim Oakley 
 Pat Fitzpatrick as Mickie Oakley 
 Basil Gill as Dr. Walter Merkin 
 Raymond Lovell as Duke 
 Lorna Hubbard as Daisy Oakley 
 Roy Findlay as Louie 
 Elliott Mason as Euphie 
 Desmond Roberts as Paul Kendall

References

Bibliography
 Chibnall, Steve. Quota Quickies: The Birth of the British 'B' Film. British Film Institute, 2007.
 Low, Rachael. Filmmaking in 1930s Britain. George Allen & Unwin, 1985.
 Wood, Linda. British Films, 1927-1939. British Film Institute, 1986.

External links

1936 films
British crime films
1936 crime films
1930s English-language films
Films directed by Ralph Ince
Quota quickies
Films shot at Teddington Studios
Warner Bros. films
British black-and-white films
1930s British films